Fiscal is a municipality in the province of Huesca, Sobrarbe comarca, Aragon, Spain. 
It is located 76 kilometers from Huesca. It is 768 meters above sea level, and covers an area of 170 km². As of 2018, it had a population of 327 inhabitants.

Geography 
Villages: Albella, Arresa, Borrastre, Jánovas, Javierre de Ara, Lacort, Lardiés, Ligüerre de Ara, Planillo, San Felices de Ara, San Juste, San Martín de Solana and Santa Olaria de Ara.

See also
Solana Valley

External links 

Best Walking trails in Fiscal, Aragon (Spain)

Municipalities in the Province of Huesca